KWLZ (99.3 FM) is an American commercial radio station licensed to Shasta Lake, California, serving the Northern California area.

History
For over a decade, KNNN aired a CHR music format branded as "Mix 99.3". From its inception until the "Mix 99.3" brand was introduced, the station was known as "K-9 FM", and played a pop-based Adult Contemporary format. The original "K-9" AC format was the result of a listener voting process following a months-long format testing experiment, where a different format was played every hour of the day.

In January 2007, 99.3 flipped to country as "99.3 Hank FM."

On September 20, 2010, KNNN changed their call letters to KQMS-FM and changed their format to news/talk, simulcasting KQMS, as Hank FM and the KNNN calls moved to 87.7.

On January 15, 2017, 99.3 dropped the KQMS simulcast and began stunting with a loop of "Wild Thing" by Tone Lōc. On January 18, KQMS-FM launched a rhythmic contemporary format, branded as "Wild 99.3" under the new calls KWLZ, launching with 10,000 songs in a row. The first song was "Fake Love" by Drake.

Former logos

References

External links

WLZ
Radio stations established in 1989
Contemporary hit radio stations in the United States
1989 establishments in California